Prog is a British magazine dedicated to progressive rock music, published by Future. The magazine, which is edited by Jerry Ewing, was launched in March 2009 as a spin-off from Classic Rock and covers both past and present artists. Other current staff are Natasha Scharf (Deputy Editor), Russell Fairbrother (Art Editor), Grant Moon (News Editor), and Dave Everley (Album Reviews Editor).

History and profile
Prog is published by Future, who are also responsible for its "sister" publications Classic Rock and Metal Hammer. 

Prog was published nine times per year until 2012, when its frequency was switched to ten times a year.

According to The Guardian in 2010, the magazine was selling 22,000 copies an issue, half the circulation of the NME. Journalist and broadcaster Gavin Esler described it in 2014 as "one of the few music magazines I can think of whose circulation is healthy".

On 19 December 2016, TeamRock called in the administrators with the loss of 70 jobs, after experiencing financial difficulties. TeamRock's stable of titles including Classic Rock, Metal Hammer, and Prog, temporarily suspended publication. 

On 8 January 2017, Prog, along with sister magazines Classic Rock and Metal Hammer, were bought by previous owners Future for £800,000.

On 27 March 2018, the family of Future's UK consumer music magazines including Prog re-branded and became covered under the umbrella title of Louder (also known as Louder Sound), with loudersound.com serving as the main online portal for the publications.

Progressive Music Awards
Prog magazine was also behind the annual Progressive Music Awards that was established in 2012.

2012 winners 
The 2012 Progressive Music Award winners in full:
New Blood: TesseracT
Live Event: Anathema
Grand Design: Pink Floyd's Immersion Reissues
Anthem: Squackett's "A Life Within A Day"
Album of the Year: Rush's Clockwork Angels
Visionary: Peter Hammill
Lifetime Achievement: Genesis
Virtuoso: Carl Palmer
Guiding Light: Steven Wilson
Prog God: Rick Wakeman

2013 winners 
Winners

Limeling: Sound of Contact
Breakthrough: Big Big Train
Anthem: Von Hertzen Brothers, "Flowers and Rust"
Event: Steve Hackett, Genesis Revisited at Hammersmith Apollo
Band of the Year: Marillion
Album: Steven Wilson, The Raven That Refused to Sing (And Other Stories)
Grand Design: Family Box Set
Virtuoso: Mike Portnoy
Visionary: Steve Hillage
Guiding Light: Thomas Waber, founder of InsideOut
Lifetime Achievement: Dave Brock
Prog God: Ian Anderson

2014 winners 
The 2014 Progressive Music Award winners in full:

Limelight: Messenger
Live Event: Rick Wakeman - Journey to the Centre of the Earth 40th Anniversary Tour
Breakthrough: Syd Arthur
Anthem: Anathema - Anathema 
The Storm Thorgerson Grand Design: Fish - A Feast of Consequences
Album of the Year: Transatlantic - Kaleidoscope
Band of the Year: Dream Theater
Outer Limits: Uriah Heep
Virtuoso: Arjen Anthony Lucassen
Guiding Light: Sonja Kristina
Visionary: Robert John Godfrey
Lifetime Achievement: Andrew Latimer
Prog God: Peter Gabriel

2015 winners 
The 2015 Progressive Music Award winners in full:

Limelight (for up-and-coming bands): Heights
Live event: Marillion Weekends
Vanguard (for acts who deserve wider recognition): Purson
Anthem: Public Service Broadcasting - Gagarin
The Storm Thorgerson grand design (box set design): Steven Wilson - Hand. Cannot. Erase.
Album of the year: Steven Wilson - Hand. Cannot. Erase.
Band of the year: Opeth
Commercial breakthrough: Steven Wilson
Outer Limits: Roy Wood
Virtuoso: Danny Thompson
Guiding light: Roger Dean
Visionary: Bill Nelson
Lifetime achievement: Gentle Giant
Prog God: Tony Banks

2016 winners 
The 2016 Progressive Music Award winners in full:

Limelight (for up-and-coming bands): The Anchoress
Live event: Big Big Train Weekends
Vanguard (for acts who deserve wider recognition): The Mute Gods
Anthem: Riverside - Towards The Blue Horizon
The Storm Thorgerson grand design : Anthony Phillips - Esoteric Reissue Series
Album of the year: iamthemorning - Lighthouse
Band of the year: Big Big Train
Outer Limits: Buggles
Virtuoso: Jakko Jakszyk
Guiding light: Andy Summers
Visionary: Jon Hiseman
Lifetime achievement: Van der Graaf Generator
Prog God: Jon Anderson

2017 winners 

The 2017 Progressive Music Award winners in full:

Limelight - Beatrix Players
Video of the Year - King Crimson - Heroes
Event of the Year - Be Prog! My Friend
Reissue of the Year - Steve Hillage - Searching For The Spark
Album Cover of the Year - Tim Bowness - Lost in the Ghost Light
Album of the Year - Anathema - The Optimist
International Band of the Year - Opeth
UK Band of the Year - Marillion
Outer Limits - Mark King
Outstanding Musical Achievement - John Miles
Chris Squire Virtuoso - Steve Hackett
Visionary - Voivod
Industry VIP - Max Hole
Lifetime Achievement - Eddie Jobson
Prog God - Carl Palmer

2018 winners 
The 2018 Progressive Music Award winners in full:
 Limelight: Midas Fall
 Video of the Year: Orphaned Land – "Like Orpheus"
 Event of the Year: Space Rocks
 Reissue of the Year: Alan Parsons Project – Eye In The Sky 35th Anniversary Box Set
 Album Cover of the Year: Big Big Train –The Second Brightest Star
 International Band/Artist of the Year: Premiata Forneria Marconi (PFM)
 Album of the Year: To The Bone
 UK Band/Artist of the Year: Steven Wilson
 Outer Limits: Claudia Brücken
 Outstanding Contribution: Gary Brooker
 The Chris Squire Virtuoso: Phil Manzanera
 Visionary: John Lees
 Industry VIP: Kilimanjaro Live
 Lifetime Achievement: Caravan
 Prog God: Steve Howe

2019 winners 
 Visionary: Arthur Brown
 Album Cover of the Year: Daniel Tompkins – Castles
 Video of the Year: Cellar Darling – "Insomnia"
 Chris Squire Virtuoso: John Petrucci
 Limelight: Jo Quail
 Reissue of the Year: Marillion – Clutching at Straws Deluxe Edition
 Lifetime Achievement: John Lodge
 Event of the Year: Ramblin’ Man Fair – Prog in the Park Stage
 Classic Album: Hawkwind – Warrior on the Edge of Time
 Album of the Year: Big Big Train – Grand Tour
 Outer Limits: Jack Hues
 International Band of the Year: Dream Theater
 Industry VIP: Tony Smith
 UK Band of the Year: Haken
 Prog God: Nick Mason

References

External links
 

Music magazines published in the United Kingdom
Magazines established in 2009
Progressive rock